Essendon and Flemington was an electoral district of the Victorian Legislative Assembly from 1889 to 1904. It was held for most of its existence by future Prime Minister Alfred Deakin before his switch to federal politics in 1901. It was abolished in 1904 and replaced with separate Essendon and Flemington electorates.

Members for Essendon and Flemington

References

Former electoral districts of Victoria (Australia)
1889 establishments in Australia
1904 disestablishments in Australia